Paraburkholderia endofungorum is a gram-negative, catalase and oxidase-positive, motile bacterium which is able to grow under aerobic and microaerophilic conditions without a CO2 atmosphere, from the genus Paraburkholderia and the family Burkholderiaceae.

References

endofungorum
Bacteria described in 2007